City of Men is a 2007 Brazilian drama film directed by Paulo Morelli. The screenplay was written by Elena Soarez based on a story by Morelli and Soarez. It is a film version of the TV series Cidade dos Homens that ran for four seasons in Brazil, following the international success of the film City of God (2002), both co-directed by Fernando Meirelles who also co-produces this film.

Plot
Best friends Acerola ("Ace") and Laranjinha ("Wallace") live in the favelas of Rio de Janeiro, and have been raised without their fathers. They are turning eighteen as a war between rival drug gangs begins around them. Wallace, with Ace's help, gets to meet his father, Heraldo, in person, a parolee living not very far away, only to witness the police arrest of his father a few days after. Wallace and Ace discover that their fathers were best friends, but Heraldo killed Ace's father in a robbery incident. Each discovers things about his missing father that could potentially compromise their solid friendship. At the end, they decide to leave "the Hill" and lead a responsible life.

Cast
 Douglas Silva as Acerola, "Ace"
 Darlan Cunha as Laranjinha, or "Wallace"
 Jonathan Haagensen as Madrugadão
 Rodrigo dos Santos as Heraldo
 Camila Monteiro as Cris
 Naima Silva as Camila
 Eduardo Piranha as Nefasto
 Luciano Vidigal as Fiel
 Pedro Henrique as Caju

Reception 
On review aggregator website Rotten Tomatoes, City of Men currently has an approval rating of 74% and an average score of 6.7 out of 10, based on 82 critic reviews. The site's critical consensus reads, "Brutal and unflinching, City of Men is both a harrowing look at Brazil's favela life, and a touching tale of youths rushed into adulthood." The film also receives a weighted average rating of 63 out of 100 on Metacritic based on 25 critic reviews, indicating "generally favorable reviews".

Accolades
 Best Special Effects - 2007 Cinema Brazil Grand Prize (nominated)

References

External links
 

2007 crime drama films
2007 films
Teen crime films
Brazilian coming-of-age films
Brazilian crime drama films
Hood films
Films based on television series
Films set in Rio de Janeiro (city)
Films shot in Rio de Janeiro (city)
2000s Portuguese-language films
Films scored by Antônio Pinto
Works about organized crime in Brazil
2000s American films